Carl Van Ness is the Curator of Manuscripts & Archives Department in the University of Florida Libraries' Special & Area Studies Collections, and was appointed the University Historian for the University of Florida in 2006. He followed the former University Historian, Sam Proctor.

Prior to this position Van Ness served as the University of Florida archivist from 1996 to 2006, and worked for the George A. Smathers Libraries.

References

External links
 Honoring the Past, Shaping the Future, book by Carl Van Ness and Kevin McCarthy; the book is openly and freely available in the UF Digital Collections.
 Newspaper article about Van Ness
 University Archives
 Alligator article about Van Ness
 University of Florida Archives Photo Collection in the University of Florida Digital Collections
 University of Florida Historical Marker Program
 The University of Florida Trivia Book by Carl Van Ness

Living people
University of Florida faculty
Year of birth missing (living people)